Waldstätten may refer to:
 Waldstätte, a term for a "rural canton" in the Old Swiss Confederacy
 Canton of Waldstätten of the Helvetic Republic

See also
 Federal Charter of 1291, uniting three cantons of Switzerland